Ladheke is a village situated in the outskirts of Lahore near Raiwind, in Punjab, Pakistan, near the eastern border with India.  Its name is based on a Sikh public figure of the area. Chief Minister of Punjab, Mian Muhammad Shahbaz Shareef contested elections from here.

References

Nawaz Sharif administration
Nishtar Town
Villages in Lahore District

 Dhillon Family recently Shifted at Dadheke Unchy Near PSO Station. Dhillon House's Owner Ch Arshad Ali is a Famous Name in Lahore Real Estates Business